Maine School Administrative District 44 (MSAD 44 or SAD 44) is a school district containing the towns of Bethel, Gilead, Greenwood, Newry, and Woodstock, in Oxford County, Maine.

Schools 
The school district is composed of the following schools:
Crescent Park Elementary School in Bethel
Principal:Levi Brown, Guidance Counselor: Katina Colobotos
Woodstock Elementary School in Bryant Pond
Principal: Jolene Littlehale, Guidance Counselor: Katina Colobotos
 Telstar Regional Middle School in Bethel
Principal: Clark Rafford, Guidance Counselor: Joseph Bailey
 Telstar Regional High School
Principal: Mark Kenney

Notes

External links 
Official site
2005-06 Annual Report

44
Education in Oxford County, Maine